Bainbridge may refer to:

People
Bainbridge (name)

Places
 Bainbridge Township (disambiguation)

United States
 Bainbridge Island, Alaska
 Bainbridge, Georgia
 Bainbridge, Indiana
 Bainbridge (town), New York
 Bainbridge (village), New York
 Bainbridge, Geauga County, Ohio
 Bainbridge, Ross County, Ohio
 Bainbridge, Pennsylvania
 Bainbridge Island, Washington
 United States Naval Training Center Bainbridge, Maryland

Other countries
 Bainbridge, British Columbia, Canada
 Bainbridge, North Yorkshire, England

Other
 Bainbridge College, a community college in Bainbridge, Georgia, US
 Bainbridge Cup, a trophy in the game of pickleball
 Bainbridge reflex, in Physiology, also called the atrial reflex
 5 ships named 
 Bainbridge, the former name of the John Lewis Newcastle department store in Newcastle upon Tyne, England